Baroda High School, Alkapuri, abbreviated as Baroda High School, is a coeducational English medium private school serving grades Lower Kindergarten to 12. It is located in Vadodara, Gujarat, India. It is managed by the Baroda Lions Club Education Trust and follows the Gujarat State Education Board curriculum. It has about 1500 students in the pre-primary and the primary section, 850 in the secondary and higher secondary section and about 175 in the commerce section.

History
Baroda High School, Alkapuri, was founded on 13 August 1974 in Baroda, Gujarat .

Class distribution
The school classes are divided into two sections: Primary and Secondary. The Primary Section consists of grades Kindergarten through 8. The Secondary Section consists of grades 9 through 12.

Uniform

Class schedule
A school day consists of eight classes. Each class lasts approximately 35 minutes. The recess falls at the end of the 4th class, lasting about 30 minutes.

Student government
The Primary and Secondary section have their own student government. Each student is assigned one of the four houses: Red, Blue, Green and Yellow. The student government comprises:
 Four Prefects in each classroom (one for each house)
 Four Head Prefect, overlooking the class prefects (one for each house)
 Head Boy/Vice Head Boy and Head Girl/Vice Head Girl overlooking the head prefects.

Elections
 Elections are held each year to elect the Head Boy/Vice Head Boy and Head Girl/Vice Head Girl. Only 7th and 12th grade students are eligible to run in the Primary Section and Secondary Section elections, respectively. The Head Boy/Vice Head Boy and Head Girl/Vice Head Girl candidates run the campaign in pairs. Campaigning involves making speeches, putting up posters in the school. During recess, candidates find a high spot in the playground and throw up home-made, scented confetti carrying their name up in the air. The supporters who would have gathered around the candidate try to grab the scented confetti.

Sports activities include volleyball, cricket, Kabaddi, Kho Kho. The Primary and Secondary sections host an Annual Sports Day event in which students compete against each other in sports such as running, high jump, long jump, slow cycling, Kabaddi, cricket and volleyball.

Facilities

Secondary Section
 Physics Lab
 Chemistry Lab
 Biology Lab
 Computer Lab
 Library
 Physical Education Room
 Canteen

References

Schools in Vadodara
Educational institutions established in 1974